Sidama Coffee Sport Club (Amharic: ሲዳማ ቡና  ስፖርት ክለብ, Sidama Buna Sport Club), also known as Dara kenema, is  a professional football Club based in Sidama Municipality of Ethiopia. The club plays in the Ethiopian Premier League, the top division of Ethiopian football.

History 

Sidama Coffee Soccer Club was founded on August 27, 2006 (1999 E.C.) as Dara Kenema. It was one of three clubs representing Formerly  Sidama Zone in the South regional championships in 2006. Afterwards Dara kenema was able to advance to the championships for all regional teams from Ethiopia held in Hawassa that same year. Dara Kenema was finished in the top four of this tournament and by virtue enter the second division of Ethiopian football, the Higher League. The name Dara Kenama was changed to Sidama Coffee because the team was the only team to represent Sidama in the second division.

Promotion 
Sidama Coffee won the second division of Ethiopian football, the Ethiopian Higher League (formerly called the National League), in the 2008–09 season (2001 E.C.) earning a promotion to the Ethiopian Premier League. Sidama Coffee's first season in the Premier League was the 2009–10 season.

Sidama beat Arba Minch City 3–1 to lift 2016 South Castle Cup. Sidama forward Addis Gidey won Most Valuable Player and Top Goal Scorer for the Tournament. Sidama had one of their most successful campaigns in the 2016–17 season as the club was part of the title race until very late in the season before ultimately finishing 4th behind eventual champions Saint George S.C. In March 2018, the club sacked its manager Alemayehu Abayne after poor results and repeated clashes between himself and players on the team.

Grounds 
The club play their home games at Hawassa Metropolis Stadium in Hawassa, located 14.7 miles from Shashamane and 173 miles from Addis Abeba.

Players

First-team squad
As of 11 March 2021

Club Officials 
President: Mengistu Sasamo

Coaching and Medical staff 
Manager/Head coach: Wondimagegn Teshome 

Assistant coach:Paul Ikem

First-team goalkeeping coach: Sintayehu Gidyelhu

Former Managers 
Alemayehu Abayneh
Zelalem Shifraw
 Zeray Mulu (2017-2021) - as assistant and head coach
Gebremedin Haile

References

External links
Club logo

Football clubs in Ethiopia
Sidama Region